Kagiso is a township in Gauteng Province, South Africa. Kagiso or Kagisho may also refer to:

Kagiso (given name)
Kagiso Media, a media corporation in South Africa